The 212th Coastal Division was an infantry division of the Royal Italian Army during World War II. Royal Italian Army coastal divisions were second line divisions formed with reservists and equipped with second rate materiel. They were often commanded by officers called out of retirement.

History 
The division was activated on 15 November 1941 in Catanzaro by reorganizing the XII Coastal Sector Command. The division was assigned to XXXI Army Corps, which was responsible for the defense of southern Calabria. The division was responsible for the coastal defence of the coast of central Calabria: on the Tyrrhenian Sea side from Capo Vaticano to the outskirts of Serra d'Aiello, on the Ionian Sea side from Badolato to Cropani.

In early September 1943 the division prepared to fight the British XIII Corps, which had landed on 3 September 1943 in southern Calabria in Operation Baytown and was advancing towards the 212th Coastal Division's positions. After the Armistice of Cassibile was announced on 8 September 1943 the division remained at its positions and surrendered to the British XIII Corps. Afterwards the division joined the Italian Co-belligerent Army, but did not participate in the Italian campaign. The division was dissolved in summer 1944.

Organization 
 212th Coastal Division, in Catanzaro
 103rd Coastal Regiment (transferred to the 214th Coastal Division on 1 July 1943)
 CCCXLII Coastal Battalion
 VI Dismounted Squadrons Group/ Regiment "Lancieri di Novara"
 115th Coastal Regiment
 CCXVI Coastal Battalion
 CCCXLVI Coastal Battalion
 XII Dismounted Squadrons Group/ Regiment "Cavalleggeri di Alessandria"
 144th Coastal Regiment
 CCX Coastal Battalion
 CCCXLVII Coastal Battalion
 VII Dismounted Squadrons Group/ Regiment "Lancieri di Firenze"
 VIII Dismounted Squadrons Group/ Regiment "Lancieri di Aosta"
 45th Coastal Artillery Regiment
 IX Coastal Artillery Group
 XI Coastal Artillery Group
 LXXXIX Coastal Artillery Group
 CCVII Artillery Group (152/40 naval guns)
 CVIII Machine Gun Battalion
 56th Anti-tank Company (47/32 anti-tank guns; transferred from the 56th Infantry Division "Casale")
 108th Mortar Company (81mm Mod. 35 mortars)
 414th Mortar Company 81mm Mod. 35 mortars)
 212th Mixed Engineer Company
 189th Anti-paratroopers Unit
 320th Anti-paratroopers Unit
 321st Anti-paratroopers Unit
 324th Anti-paratroopers Unit
 443rd Anti-paratroopers Unit
 444th Anti-paratroopers Unit
 445th Anti-paratroopers Unit
 446th Anti-paratroopers Unit
 212th Carabinieri Section
 181st Field Post Office
 Division Services

Attached to the division:
 DCIV Coastal Battalion
 Armored Train 152/3/T, in Crotone (4x 152/40 naval guns, 4x 20/77 anti-aircraft guns; transferred to the 214th Coastal Division on 1 July 1943)

Commanding officers 
The division's commanding officers were:

 Generale di Brigata Ugo Medori (15 November 1941 - 1 March 1942)
 Colonel Felice Pellegrini (acting, 2-13 March 1942)
 Generale di Brigata Ugo Medori (14 March 1942 - ?)

References 

 
 

Coastal divisions of Italy
Infantry divisions of Italy in World War II